This is the list of cathedrals in Belarus sorted by denomination.

Eastern Orthodox
Cathedrals of the Belarusian Orthodox Church:
 Cathedral of the Holy Spirit in Minsk
 Saint Sophia Cathedral in Polotsk
 Holy Virgin Protection Cathedral in Vitebsk
 Cathedral of the Epiphany in Polotsk
 St. Peter and Paul Cathedral in Gomel
 Holy Protection Cathedral in Hrodna
 St. Michael's Cathedral in Lida
 Cathedral of Sts. Boris and Gleb in Navahrudak
 Savior's Transfiguration Cathedral in Slonim
 Holy Nativity of the Mother of God Cathedral in Glubokoye
 St. Michael's Cathedral in Slutsk

Roman Catholic
Cathedrals of the Roman Catholic Church in Belarus:
 Cathedral Basilica of St. Francis Xavier in Grodno
 Cathedral of the Blessed Virgin Mary in Minsk
 Cathedral Basilica of the Assumption of the Blessed Virgin Mary in Pinsk
 Cathedral of the Merciful Jesus in Vitebsk
 Co-Cathedral of the Assumption of the Blessed Virgin and St. Stanislaus in Mohilev

See also
Lists of cathedrals by country

References

Cathedrals in Belarus
Belarus
Cathedrals
Cathedrals